Pseudagrion sudanicum, the blue-sided sprite is a species of damselfly in the family Coenagrionidae. It is found in Botswana, the Democratic Republic of the Congo, Gambia, Ghana, Malawi, Mozambique, Namibia, Nigeria, South Africa, Sudan, Uganda, Zambia, and Zimbabwe. Its natural habitats are intermittent rivers and freshwater marshes.

References

Coenagrionidae
Insects described in 1915
Taxonomy articles created by Polbot